Paolo Ventura (born 1968, Milan, Italy) is an Italian photographer, artist and set designer based in Milan.

Life and work 
Ventura grew up in Milan with summers spent in the hilltops of Eastern Tuscany. His father, Piero Ventura, was a children's book author during the 1970s and 1980s. At the end of the 1980s, Ventura attended the Academy of Fine Arts of Brera.

At the beginning of the 1990s he started working as a fashion photographer. In a few years he was working with fashion magazines such as Elle, MarieClaire, Amica, Vogue Gioiello, among others.

Toward the end of the 1990s, ten years into his career, Ventura gradually stepped out of the world of fashion photography and he moved to New York to pursue his personal artistic path. In his studio in Brooklyn he began to build and photograph small dioramas about World War II in Italy, based on memories and tales from his grandmother.

In 2006 Contrasto published “War Souvenirs", a collection of this work, with a foreword by the American writer Francine Prose.

The work was followed by a number of exhibitions worldwide.

The BBC included Ventura's works in the documentary about photography: “The Genius of Photography” (2007).

Three years later, he began his second major project: “Winter Stories” (2009), which became a book published by Aperture with a foreword by Eugenia Perry.

In that same period he began to work with different galleries in NY and in Europe followed by exhibitions and acquisitions from Museums and Photographic Institutions from around the world. In 2010 the Library of Congress of the U.S. acquired a collection of 142 Polaroids from his "War Souvenirs" series and the Museum of Fine Arts of Boston acquired in its permanent collection a print from his "Winter Stories".

In the following years he created other projects like “The Automaton”, published by Dewi Lewis in 2012 and “Behind The Walls” by Danilo Montanari Editore.

In 2010 he moved back to Italy, to Anghiari, a small town in Tuscany. There, in an old studio in the countryside, he began work on his project “Short Stories” using his family as his photographic subjects. In 2016 Aperture published a collection of this work in a book titled “Short Stories”.

In 2012 the Museum of Contemporary Art in Rome (MACRO) presented a solo exhibition of Ventura's work titled "Lo Zuavo Scomparso". A book by the same name is published by Punctum.

Canadian filmmaker Helen Doyle included the work of Ventura in her 2013 movie “An Ocean of Images” In the same year the Swiss Television dedicated a short documentary to Ventura's work that was transmitted on Swiss National Television.

In 2015, the Dutch documentary film-maker, Erik Van Empel, directed a full-length documentary on Ventura titled “Paolo Ventura: The Vanishing Man” which won The Prix Italia in 2016 as the best movie in the TV Performing Arts category.

In the same year, Ventura began his first collaboration in theater. Working with director Rob Ashford, he realized the scenography for Rodgers and Hammerstein’s “Carousel” at the Lyric Opera of Chicago.

In 2018, Ventura continued his work in theater, collaborating with director Gabriele Lavia, to create the set design and costumes for Ruggero Leoncavallo’s opera “Pagliacci” at the Teatro Regio in Turin.

Bibliography 
 "Autobiografia di un Impostore" narrata da Laura Leonelli, Johan & Levi editore, 2021
 "Paolo Ventura, Photographs and Drawings", Silvana Editoriale, 2020
 "Short Stories", Aperture, 2016
 "The Automaton", Dewi Lewis, 2012
 "Lo Zuavo Scomparso", Punctum Press, 2012
 "War Souvenirs", Contrasto Editore, 2006
 "Winter Stories", Aperture, 2009

Exhibitions

Main solo exhibitions 
 2021 L'arte al tempo del Covid, MAC Museum of Contemporary Art, Sao Paulo, Brasil
 2021 The Families of Man, Museo Archeologico Regionale, Aosta, Italy
 2020 "Carousel", Camera Centro Italiano per la Fotografia, Torino, Italy
 2020 "The Automaton", Műcsarnok Kunsthalle, Budapest, Hungary
 2019 New 20th Anniversary Exhibition, The Margulies Collection at the Warehouse, Miami, Usa
 2019 Make Believe: Fantasy, fairy tales and Magic from five contemporary photographers. Museum of Fine Arts Boston, Usa
 2019 Commissione Roma 2003-2017 e le acquisizioni al patrimonio fotografico di Roma Capitale, Palazzo Braschi, Rome, Italy
 2018 "Racconti Immaginari", Silos Armani, Milan, Italy
 2018 "Racconti di Guerra", MAG Museo Alto Garda, Riva del Garda, Italy
 2017 Pagliacci, Camera, Italian Center for Photography, Turin, Italy
 2016 Mystique Narratives II, Flatland Gallery, Amsterdam, The Netherlands
 2016 “Paolo Ventura. Obras de la Colecciòn Cotroneo”, Sala Municipales de Exposiciones, Valladolid, Spain 
 2016 Mystique Narratives, Flatland Gallery, Amsterdam, The Netherlands 
 2015 Un Mondo Infinito, Museum Het Valkhof, Nijmagen, The Netherlands
 2015 La Città Infinita, Weinstein Gallery, Minneapolis, Usa
 2015 Short Stories, Gallery Baton, Seoul, South Korea
 2014 L’Homme à la Valise, Fotokino, Marseille, France 
 2014 Träume, Die Galerie, Munich, Germany
 2014 L’archivio Ritrovato di V.P., Palazzo dei Pio, Carpi, Italy 
 2013 The Infinite City, Atlas Gallery, London, UK
 2013 Il Mago Futurista, MART Casa d’Arte Futurista Depero, Rovereto, Italy
 2013 The Infinite City, Hasted Kraeutler Gallery, New York, Usa
 2013 Lo Zuavo Scomparso, Gallery Baton, Seoul, South Korea
 2013 il Teatro della Memoria, FAR Fabbrica Arte Rimini, Rimini, Italy
 2013 La collezione di Kim e Paolo Ventura, Museo della Citta, Rimini, Italy
 2012 Recent Works, Italian Academy at Columbia University, New York, Usa
 2012 Lo Zuavo Scomparso, MACRO Museum of Contemporary Art of Roma, Rome, Italy
 2012 Behind the Walls, Forma Gallery, Milan, Italy
 2012 The Funeral of the Anarchist, Obsolete, Los Angeles, Usa
 2011 The Automaton of Venice, Hasted Kraeutler Gallery, New York, Usa
 2011 Behind the Walls, Photographica Fine Art Gallery, Lugano, Switzerland
 2011 L’Automa, Museo Fortuny, Venice, Italy
 2011 Selected Works, Gallery Baton, Seoul, South Korea
 2011 Winter Stories, Halsey Institute of Contemporary Art, Charleston, South Carolina, Usa
 2009 Winter stories, Hasted Hunt Kraeutler Gallery, New York, Usa
 2009 Winter Stories, Galerie Camera Obscura, Paris, France
 2009 Winter Stories, Studio la Citta’, Verona, Italy
 2009 Fabulous Fictions, The Hague Museum of Photography, The Hague, The Netherlands
 2009 Winter Stories, Central Exhibition Hall, Moscow, Russia
 2008 Storie D’Inverno, Forma International Center of Photography, Milano, Italy
 2008 Winter Stories, Hasted Hunt Gallery, New York, United States
 2007 Souvenir de Guerre, Maison de la Photographie Npdc, Lille, France
 2007 Viaggio nella Memoria, Galleria Nazionale d’Arte Moderna, Rome, Italy
 2006 In Tempo di Guerra, Forma International Center of Photography, Milan, Italy
 2006 Souvenir de Guerre, Rencontres de la Photographie, Arles, France
 2006 War Souvenir, Hasted Hunt Gallery, New York
 2006 War Souvenir, Lazia Nowa, Kraków, Poland
 2006 War Souvenir, A-3 Gallery, Moscow, Russia

Group exhibitions 
 2016 20 Years, Weinstein Gallery, Minneapolis, United States
 2016 Photomed, Festival of Mediterranean Photography, Sanary-sur-Mer, France
 2016 Fotografia Europea, La Via Emilia. Strade, viaggi e confini, Reggio Emilia, Italy
 2015 Festival Photo La Gacilly, Bretagne, France
 2015 Bienal Internacional Fotografica Bogota’, Fotomuseo, Museo National de la Fotografia de Colombia
 2015 Italia Inside Out, I Fotografi Italiani, Palazzo della Ragione, Milan, Italy
 2015 Questa è guerra, Palazzo del Monte di Pietà, Padova, Italy
 2014 La Guerra che Verrà Non è la Prima 1914-2014, MART  Museum of Modern and Contemporary Art, Rovereto, Italy
 2014 Turning Point, Hungarian National Gallery, Budapest, Hungary
 2014 La Mémoire Traversée, Eléphant Paname/Mois de la Photo, Paris, France
 2014 Festival Internazionale di Fotografia di Roma, MACRO Museum of Contemporary Art, Rome, Italy
 2014 Historia, Miradas de Artistas, Marco, Museo de Arte Contemporanea de Vigo, Spain
 2014 Histoire, Regards d’Artistes, Hotel des Arts, Centre du Conseil General du Var, Toulon, France
 2013 Next Stop Italy, The Phllips Collection, Washington D.C., Usa
 2012 Do You Remember the First Time?, Atlas Gallery, London, UK
 2012 New Acquisitions from the MACRO Collection, MACRO Museum of Contemporary Art, Rome, Italy
 2012 La Collezione di Italo Zannier, PARCO Galleria D’Arte Moderno e Contemporanea, Pordenone, Italy
 2012 La Fotografia della Collezione Trevisan, MART Museum of Modern and Contemporary Art, Rovereto, Italy
 2012 The Silent Village, DOX Centre for Contemporary Art, Prague, Czech Republic
 2011 Sembianze, Galleria D’Arte Moderna e Contemporanea, Repubblica di San Marino
 2011 54th Venice Biennial, Italian Pavilion, Venice, Italy
 2011 Otherworldly, Museum of Art and Design, New York, Usa
 2011 New Yorker Fiction/Real Photography, Steven Kasher Gallery, New York, Usa
 2009 Manipulating Reality, Centro di Cultura Contemporanea Strozzina, Palazzo Strozzi, Florence, Italy 
 2009 Collection from Maison Europeenne de la Photographie, Italian Cultural Institute, São Paulo, Brazil
 2009 La Photographie Italiens des Annees 50 a Nos Jours, Centre National de l’Audiovisuel, Luxembourg
 2009 Photography From the Permanent Collection, Lowe Art Museum, Miami, Usa
 2009 New York Photographs, Hasted Hunt Gallery, New York, Usa
 2008 Contemporary Photographic Views, Weinstein Gallery, Minneapolis, Usa
 2008 Inside the Human Space, Isola di San Servolo, Venice, Italy
 2008 The New Original Photo, Interalla Gallery, Seoul, South Korea
 2008 Una Historia Privada, Theatro Circo Price, Madrid, Spain
 2008 Ellis Island and Beyond, Aperture Gallery, New York, Usa
 2008 Roma, Palazzo Delle Esposizioni, Rome, Italy
 2008 Una Storia Privata, Museo Bilotti, Rome, Italy
 2007 NYC, Phillips De Pury Gallery, New York, Usa
 2007 Hunter and Hanted, Sara Tecchia Gallery, New York, Usa
 2007 On the Wall, Aperture Gallery, New York, Usa
 2007 Luci su Milano, New art acquisitions of Unicredit Bank, Milan, Italy
 2006 Une Histoire Privee, Maison Europeenne de la Photographie, Paris, France

External links 
 Official Website
 Flatland Gallery, Amsterdam
 Weinstein Gallery, Minneapolis
 Baton Gallery, Seoul
Gallery Baton on Ocula

References 

1968 births
Living people
Italian photographers